Zoink'd was a children's television game show that started on March 15, 2012, and ended on August 20, 2013, appearing on Canadian cable channel YTV. The show was produced by Pivotal Media, based in Toronto. It was hosted by Adam Christie, the show spotlighted the "weird and wacky" talent of adults, who were then rated by a panel of judges, made up of four children. Broadcast on Saturday evenings, the show targeted an audience which includes children and families.

Summary 
This talent show had kids as the judges and adults as the entertainers, each performer had one minute to entertain them, if one gets bored in 20 seconds, (s)he would pull the lever, extracting confetti, if another is bored, (s)he would pull the lever to extract more confetti, or sometimes balls, if one or more are extremely bored, they would pull the lever to extract goo, and then they would be eliminated, the winner at the end wins the title of 'Zoink Master' and $1000.

External Links
 Zoink'd - IMDb

References 

YTV (Canadian TV channel) original programming
Canadian children's game shows
2013 Canadian television series endings
2012 Canadian television series debuts
2010s Canadian game shows
2010s Canadian children's television series
Television series about children